The Philippine House Committee on Women and Gender Equality, or House Women and Gender Equality Committee is a standing committee of the Philippine House of Representatives.

Jurisdiction 
As prescribed by House Rules, the committee's jurisdiction is on the rights and welfare of women and female children and youth, including their education, employment and working conditions, and their role in nation building, and all concerns relating to gender equality.

Members, 19th Congress

Historical Members

Members, 18th Congress

See also
 House of Representatives of the Philippines
 List of Philippine House of Representatives committees

References

External links
House of Representatives of the Philippines

Women and Gender Equality
Women in the Philippines